Pikolin is a Spanish mattress manufacturer headquartered in Zaragoza (Aragon). The company was founded in 1948 and subsequently opened branches in Portugal, France, Italy and Malaysia. It had an annual turnover of €183 million in 2005, and employs between 1,500 and 1,600 workers, depending on production needs (about 1,000 people work at its plant in Zaragoza: 900 in production and 100 in administration and other services).

Marketing
The company was selected as an official sponsor of the Expo Zaragoza 2008.

References

External links
Official site

Bed manufacturers
Manufacturing companies of Spain
Spanish companies established in 1948
Manufacturing companies established in 1948
Companies based in Aragon
Zaragoza